Eurycomanone is a chemical compound that has been isolated from Eurycoma longifolia, also known as the longjack plant, tongkat ali or akar ali. Eurycomanone along side with other bioactive ingredients such as glycosaponin, and polysaccharide found in Tongkat Ali are believed to deliver pharmacological effects on health.

Eurycomanone (usually expressed as percentage) is often used as a performance marker to determine the level of potency and efficacy in a Tongkat Ali extract or supplements.

The percentage of eurycomanone that can be extract from Tongkat Ali based on Malaysian Standards MS2409 is between 0.8% - 1.5%. There are claims of higher eurycomanone content found in Tongkat Ali extract, but the authenticity of such claim needs to be further verified. 

The latest hot-water freeze-dried standardized extract technology is able to produce more consistent level of eurycomanone for every batch of Tongkat ali production.

Mechanism of action 
Eurycomanone is thought to be central to the sex-hormone increasing effects of Eurycoma longifolia supplementation. In vitro, eurycomanone has been shown to enhance testosterone steroidogenesis through its inhibitory effects on aromatase, presumably causing testosterone production to increase to restore downstream estrogen homeostasis. 

Most clinical trials and studies investigating the effects supplementation with Eurycoma longifolia in human subjects have observed increases in free and total testosterone, with some studies showing increases or no changes in estradiol, luteinizing hormone, sex binding hormone globulin and follicle-stimulating hormone in both healthy and hypogonadism-affected men.

As of November 2022, there are no studies investigating the effects of isolated Eurycomanone in human subjects.

References

Quassinoids